The 2011 North Somerset Council election took place on 5 May 2011 to elect members of North Somerset Unitary Council in Somerset, England. The whole council was up for election and the Conservative Party stayed in overall control of the council.

Background
At the last election in 2007 the Conservatives gained control of the council with 46 seats. This was compared to 6 independents, 5 Liberal Democrats, 3 Labour and 1 Green Party councillors.

In February 2011 Liberal Democrat councillor for Nailsea East Andy Cole said he would be standing in the election as an independent. Cole was one of a total of 182 candidates who stood in the election for the 61 seats on the council. These were 58 Conservatives, 53 Labour, 42 Liberal Democrats, 20 independents, 5 Green Party, 3 United Kingdom Independence Party and 1 from the All The South Party. The most candidates were in Weston-super-Mare West ward, where 12 people contested the seats.

The Conservative administration of the previous 4 years was attacked over the cost moving the council offices to Castlewood in Clevedon and over the refurbishment of the town hall in Weston-super-Mare. However the Conservatives said they had been able to make savings and therefore not had to make as big cuts as other councils.

Election result
The results saw the Conservatives remain in control of the council after winning 42 of the 61 seats. Independents won 7 seats, the Liberal Democrats 6, Labour 5 and the Green Party 1 seat.

The Liberal Democrats took 2 seats from the Conservatives in Weston-super-Mare Central and 3 seats from them in Weston-super-Mare West, but lost 3 seats back to the Conservatives in Weston-super-Mare South Worle. Meanwhile, Labour also gained 2 seats from the Conservatives in Weston-super-Mare East. Long time councillor and independent Nan Kirsen lost her seat in Pill to another independent Don Davies, standing for the Sustainable Pill and District Party, by 17 votes, while Andy Cole won his seat in Nailsea East as an independent after leaving the Liberal Democrats.

Ward results

References

2011 English local elections
2011
2010s in Somerset